Jerry Garcia was an American musician.  A guitarist, singer, and songwriter, he became famous as a member of the rock band the Grateful Dead, from 1965 to 1995.  When not touring or recording with the Dead, Garcia was often playing music in other bands and with other musicians.

From 1971 to 1975, Garcia's main musical collaborator outside the Grateful Dead was keyboardist Merl Saunders.  From 1975 to 1995, Garcia's principal side project was the Jerry Garcia Band.  The one constant member of the Jerry Garcia Band, as well as the various Saunders–Garcia lineups, was John Kahn on bass.  The Garcia Band member with the second-longest tenure, from 1980 to 1995, was keyboardist Melvin Seals.  In the 1990s, Garcia also made a number of studio recordings with mandolin player David Grisman.

In 1969, Garcia, along with John Dawson and David Nelson, co-founded the country rock band the New Riders of the Purple Sage.  Garcia played pedal steel guitar in that band, until an amicable parting of the ways in 1971.  In 1973 Garcia co-founded the short-lived bluegrass group Old & In the Way, which also included David Grisman and John Kahn.  Garcia played banjo in that band, harking back to his pre-Grateful Dead days as a bluegrass musician.

The Grateful Dead released a number of studio and live albums while they were together.  Since then, many archival concert recordings of the band have been released as albums.  The same is also true of Garcia's solo career and his collaborations with other musicians.  As a result, the discography of Jerry Garcia, as a member of the Grateful Dead and as a solo musician, includes several hundred albums.

Grateful Dead

Jerry Garcia

Jerry Garcia Band 
The Jerry Garcia Band was Jerry Garcia's main side project from 1975 to 1995.  The band played rock music that emphasized musical improvisation, in a style somewhat similar to that of the Grateful Dead, and also played many rhythm and blues songs.  The lineup of the band changed many times, especially in the early years.  The only constant member was John Kahn on bass.  The Garcia Band member with the second-longest tenure, from 1980 to 1995, was keyboardist Melvin Seals.  After Garcia died, Seals formed a band called JGB, dedicated to performing Garcia's music.

Donna Jean Godchaux, who was in the Jerry Garcia Band from 1976 to 1978, later reflected, "It was very different from the Grateful Dead in that everything was so scaled back to where we could play theaters instead of hockey rinks. It was very enjoyable on that level because these places were built for music to be played in. It was just a really unique situation to be as popular as Jerry Garcia was and still be able to be in a band that could do what we did in a smaller setting than the Grateful Dead. It was kind of like a home away from home for Jerry, in that he got this different expression of what he was feeling musically than the Grateful Dead."

Jerry Garcia Acoustic Band 
The Jerry Garcia Acoustic Band played folk and old-time music.  They were together for about a year, from 1987 to 1988.  They performed several dozen concerts, usually as the opening act for the Jerry Garcia Band.  The JGAB included two musicians who had played with Garcia in 1964 in a bluegrass band called the Black Mountain Boys – Sandy Rothman and David Nelson.

Jerry Garcia and Howard Wales 
Howard Wales was a jazz, rock, and rhythm and blues keyboard player.  In 1970 he played a number of Monday night jam sessions with Garcia at the Matrix, a small venue in San Francisco.  The two were often accompanied by John Kahn on bass and Bill Vitt on drums.

Later, Kahn recalled, "I didn't know what kind of music [Garcia] and Wales would be playing down at the Matrix when I went down.  And I still don't know!  It was kind of a weird jazz with these other influences – it was mainly Howard's music, all instrumental."  Garcia said, "Howard was so incredible, and [Kahn and I] were just hanging on for dear life.  For some reason Howard enjoyed playing with us, but we were just keeping up.  Howard was so outside.  For both of us that was a wonderful experience."

Jerry Garcia and Merl Saunders 
Merl Saunders, a keyboard player, was Garcia's main musical collaborator outside the Grateful Dead from 1971 to 1975.  Saunders and Garcia bands with different additional musicians played many concerts during this period.  One of the lineups, in 1974 and 1975, was Legion of Mary, featuring Martin Fierro on saxophone and flute, John Kahn on bass, and Ron Tutt on drums.  Saunders and Garcia also recorded two studio albums with Tom Fogerty from Creedence Clearwater Revival.

Garcia later recalled, "[Saunders] really helped me improve myself on a level of harmonic understanding....  He filled me in on all those years of things I didn't do.  I'd never played any standards; I'd never played in dance bands.  I never had any approach to the world of regular, straight music.  He knows all the standards, and he taught me how bebop works.  He taught me music.  Between the combination of Howard [Wales] and Merl, that's where I really learned music.  Before it was sort of, 'Okay, where do I plug in?'  I picked up the adult version of a musical attitude from those guys."

Jerry Garcia and David Grisman 
David Grisman is a mandolin player.  He can be heard on two songs on the 1970 Grateful Dead album American Beauty.  In 1973 he and Garcia played in the bluegrass band Old & In the Way.  From 1990 to 1995, Garcia and Grisman recorded dozens of studio sessions playing acoustic music – mostly folk, old time, and bluegrass songs – sometimes as a duo and sometimes with other musicians.  They also played some live shows during this period.

Jerry Garcia and John Kahn 
John Kahn played bass – either bass guitar or stand-up bass – in most of Jerry Garcia's bands outside the Grateful Dead.  These included the Jerry Garcia Band, the various lineups of Merl Saunders and Jerry Garcia, Old & In the Way, and the Jerry Garcia Acoustic Band.  In 1979, Garcia played in Kahn's band Reconstruction.  In the 1980s Garcia and Kahn also played some acoustic concerts as a duo.

New Riders of the Purple Sage 
The New Riders of the Purple Sage, a country rock band, was founded in 1969 by Jerry Garcia, John Dawson, and David Nelson.  Garcia played pedal steel guitar, and left the singing to the other members of the group.  Originally Phil Lesh played bass and Mickey Hart played drums; they were subsequently replaced by Dave Torbert and Spencer Dryden, respectively.  For a period of about two years, the New Riders would sometimes perform as the opening act for the Grateful Dead.  In 1971, Garcia left the band, replaced on pedal steel by Buddy Cage.  This allowed NRPS to tour independently of the Dead.  They stayed together for many years, and released a number of albums.  In 2005, Nelson and Cage re-formed the band with several new members.

Old & In the Way 
Old & In the Way was a bluegrass band that performed about 25 concerts in 1973.  Its best-known lineup was Jerry Garcia on banjo, Peter Rowan on guitar, David Grisman on mandolin, John Kahn on bass, and Vassar Clements on fiddle.

Author Jeff Tamarkin wrote, "Although OAITW was able to handle a traditional bluegrass number – vocal or instrumental – as well as anyone, the musicians brought a jam band sensibility and rock attitude to the proceedings, extending the instrumental segments with improvisations, something alien to bluegrass up to that point. By doing so, the quintet pretty much invented the concept of progressive bluegrass..."

Pre-Grateful Dead bands 
In the early 1960s, after getting out of the Army, Jerry Garcia started playing folk and old-time music.  Garcia would sing and play acoustic guitar as a member of various ensembles.  Over the next few years, he also become interested in bluegrass music, and learned to play the banjo.  During this time he was a member of a number of different bands, including the Sleepy Hollow Hog Stompers, the Hart Valley Drifters, the Wildwood Boys, and the Black Mountain Boys.  Subsequently he co-founded a jug band called Mother McCree's Uptown Jug Champions.  The jug band was a precursor of the Grateful Dead, as its members also included Bob Weir and Ron "Pigpen" McKernan.

Compilations and box sets

With other artists

Singles

Live albums by recording date 

 Before the Dead – 1961 – 1964
 Folk Time – 1962
 Mother McCree's Uptown Jug Champions – July 1964
 Side Trips, Volume One – 1970
 Vintage NRPS – February 21–23, 1971
 Garcia Live Volume 15 – May 21, 1971
 Garcia Live Volume 12 – January 23, 1973
 Garcia Live Volume Six – July 5, 1973
 Live at Keystone – July 10–11, 1973
 Keystone Encores – July 10–11, 1973
 Keystone Companions: The Complete 1973 Fantasy Recordings – July 10–11, 1973
 Old & In the Way – October 1973
 That High Lonesome Sound – October 1973
 Breakdown – October 1973
 Live at the Boarding House: The Complete Shows – October 1–8, 1973
 Live at the Boarding House – October 8, 1973
 Garcia Live Volume Nine – August 11, 1974
 Pure Jerry: Keystone Berkeley, September 1, 1974 – September 1, 1974
 Garcia Live Volume 18 – November 2, 1974
 Legion of Mary: The Jerry Garcia Collection, Vol. 1 – December 1974 – July 1975
 Garcia Live Volume Three – December 14, 1974
 Let It Rock: The Jerry Garcia Collection, Vol. 2 – November 17–18, 1975
 Garcia Live Volume Five – December 31, 1975
 Don't Let Go – May 21, 1976
 Garcia Live Volume 17 – November 7–13, 1976
 Garcia Live Volume Seven – November 8, 1976
 Pure Jerry: Theatre 1839, San Francisco, July 29 & 30, 1977 – July 29–30, 1977
 Pure Jerry: Bay Area 1978 – February – June 1978
 Pure Jerry: Warner Theatre, March 18, 1978 – March 18, 1978
 Garcia Live Volume Four – March 22, 1978
 After Midnight: Kean College, 2/28/80 – February 28, 1980
 Garcia Live Volume One – March 1, 1980
 June 26, 1981, Warfield Theatre, San Francisco, CA – June 26, 1981
 Garcia Live Volume 14 – January 27, 1986
 Pure Jerry: Marin Veterans Memorial Auditorium, San Rafael, California, February 28, 1986 – February 28, 1986
 Electric on the Eel – August 29, 1987 – August 10, 1991
 Ragged but Right – October – December 1987
 Pure Jerry: Lunt-Fontanne, New York City, The Best of the Rest, October 15–30, 1987 – October 15–30, 1987
 On Broadway: Act One – October 28th, 1987 – October 28, 1987
 Pure Jerry: Lunt-Fontanne, New York City, October 31, 1987 – October 31, 1987
 Almost Acoustic – November – December 1987
 Shining Star – 1989 – 1993
 Pure Jerry: Merriweather Post Pavilion, September 1 & 2, 1989 – September 1–2, 1989
 Fall 1989: The Long Island Sound – September 5 − 6, 1989
 Garcia Live Volume 13 – September 16, 1989
 Jerry Garcia Band – spring and summer 1990
 How Sweet It Is – spring and summer 1990
 Garcia Live Volume 10 – May 20, 1990
 Garcia Live Volume Two – August 5, 1990
 Pure Jerry: Coliseum, Hampton, VA, November 9, 1991 – November 9, 1991
 Garcia Live Volume 16 – November 15, 1991
 Garcia Live Volume Eight – November 23, 1991
 Garcia Live Volume 19 – October 31, 1992
 Garcia Live Volume 11 – December 11, 1993

References

Further reading 
 
 

Discography
Rock music discographies